Witbooi is an Afrikaans and Khoekhoe surname, common in Namibia and South Africa. It may refer to:

Hendrik Witbooi, Namaqua leader
Hendrik Samuel Witbooi, Oorlam Kaptein
Hendrik Witbooi (politician), former deputy prime minister of Namibia
Andile Witbooi, South African rugby player
Lucia Witbooi, Namibian politician
Ryan Witbooi, Namibian rugby player

Afrikaans-language surnames